Bill Harley (born William Harley, July 1, 1954 in Greenville, Ohio) is an American children's entertainer, musician, and author who has been called "the Mark Twain of contemporary children's music" by Entertainment Weekly. He uses a range of musical styles, and his audience includes both children and adults. Harley began singing and storytelling in 1975 while still in college. Much of his material is autobiographical, focusing on vignettes from childhood.

Career
Harley has released over 30 recordings. He received two Grammy Awards for Best Spoken Word Album For Children (albums consisting of predominantly spoken word versus music or song) for his albums Blah Blah Blah: Stories About Clams, Swamp Monsters, Pirates & Dogs and Yes to Running! Bill Harley Live in 2007 and 2009, and five additional Grammy nominations. He has also won Parents' Choice awards, ALA (American Library Association) awards and the highest award from the Oppenheim Toy Portfolio for his concert DVD Yes to Running.

Harley has also published numerous books. His first novel for elementary students, The Amazing Flight of Darius Frobisher, was chosen by Bank Street School of Education as one of the best children's books of the year. His second novel for children, Night of the Spadefoot Toads, was released in October 2008 and won a Green Earth Book Award. His picture books include Sitting Down To Eat, which was selected as an American Booksellers Association Pick of the List. A book from his most recent series, Charlie Bumpers vs. The Teacher of the Year, won the 2016 Beverly Cleary Children's Choice award and is part of the One School One Book programming from Read to Them.

Harley has performed in more than 2500 schools over the years. In addition to children's music, he performs at storytelling festivals around the country, including appearances at the National Storytelling Festival. He tours nationwide as an author, performing artist and keynote speaker from his home in Seekonk, Massachusetts. His 1988 album You're in Trouble had a contributing bit by Rhode Island children's performer Salty Brine, who started one of Harley's songs like a weather report, and his trademark line "No school Foster-Gloucester!"

Awards

Nominations 
 1999 Grammy Award Best Spoken Word Album For Children; Weezie And The Moon Pies
 2000 Grammy Award Best Spoken Word Album for Children; The Battle of the Mad Scientists and Other Tales of Survival
 2008 Grammy Award Best Musical Album for Children; I Wanna Play
 2010 Grammy Award Best Spoken Word Album For Children; The Best Candy In The Whole World
 2012 Grammy Award Best Album For Children; High Dive and other things that could have happened…

Awards 
 2001 National Storytelling Network's Circle of Excellence Award
 2006 Storytelling World Award; Joey, Chloe and the Swamp Monsters
 2007 Grammy Award Best Spoken Word Album For Children – Blah Blah Blah: Stories About Clams, Swamp Monsters, Pirates & Dogs
 2009 Grammy Award Best Spoken Word Album For Children – Yes to Running!
 2009 Green Earth Book Award Children's Fiction – Night of the Spadefoot Toads
 2010 Rhode Island Humanities Council Lifetime Achievement Award

Discography 

 1984:  Monsters in the Bathroom
 1986:  50 Ways to Fool Your Mother
 1987:  Dinosaurs Never Say Please
 1987:  Cool In School (with ZANZIBAR!!)
 1987: Coyote
 1988:  You're in Trouble
 1990:  Grownups Are Strange
 1990:  Come On Out and Play
 1990: I'm Gonna Let It Shine
 1994: Already Someplace Warm
 1995:  Wacka Wacka Woo
 1995:  From the Back of the Bus
 1995: Sitting On My Hands
 1996:  Lunchroom Tales: A Natural History of the Cafetorium
 1996:  Big Big World
 1996:  Who Made This Mess? (Video/DVD)
 1997:  There's A Pea On My Plate
 1998:  Weezie and the Moonpies
 1999:  The Battle of the Mad Scientists and Other Tales Of Survival
 1999:  Play It Again
 2001:  Down in the Backpack
 2002:  Sandburg Out Loud (with Carol Birch, Angela Lloyd & David Holt)
 2002:  Mistakes Were Made
 2003:  The Town Around the Bend
 2004:  cELLAbration! A Tribute to Ella Jenkins (with various artists, from Smithsonian Folkways)
 2004:  The Teachers' Lounge
 2005:  One More Time
 2005:  Blah Blah Blah
 2007:  I Wanna Play
 2008:  Yes to Running! Bill Harley Live Double CD
 2008:  Yes to Running! Bill Harley Live DVD
 2009:  First Bird Call
 2010:  Rock & Roll Playground (with various artists, from Putumayo)
 2010:  The Best Candy in the Whole World
 2012:  High Dive
 2013:  It's Not Fair to Me (with Keith Munslow)
 2014:  Nothing For Granted

Bibliography 

 1989: Peter Alsop & Bill Harley: In the Hospital
 1994: Carna and the Boots of Seven Strides
 1995: Open Ears
 1995: Nothing Happened
 1996: Sarah's Story
 1996: Sitting Down to Eat (illustrated by Kitty Harvill)
 2001: Bear's All Night Party
 2005: Dear Santa
 2006: Do It Together: A Collection of Favorite Songs
 2006: The Amazing Flight of Darius Frobisher
 2008: Dirty Joe the Pirate (illustrated by Jack Davis)
 2008: Night of the Spadefoot Toads
 2010: Between Home and School
 2012: Lost and Found (illustrated by Adam Gustavson)
 2013: Charlie Bumpers vs. the Teacher of the Year
 2014: Charlie Bumpers vs. the Really Nice Gnome
 2014: Charlie Bumpers vs. the Squeaking Skull
 2015: Charlie Bumpers vs. the Perfect Little Turkey
 2016: Charlie Bumpers vs. the Puny Pirates
 Neal Walters & Brian Mansfield (ed.) (1998) MusicHound Folk: The Essential Album Guide, p. 345-347,  (the source of his birth date and place).

References

External links 
 

Living people
American storytellers
Grammy Award winners
People from Seekonk, Massachusetts
1954 births